The following is a list of network squadrons of the United States Air Force.

Cyberspace Operations Squadrons

Information Operations Squadrons

Network Operations Squadrons

Network Support Squadrons

Network Warfare Squadrons

References

See also
 List of United States Air Force intelligence squadrons
 List of United States Air Force squadrons

Network